Fabian Heldner (born 24 June 1996) is a Swiss ice hockey player for Lausanne HC in the National League (NL) and the Swiss national team.

He represented Switzerland at the 2021 IIHF World Championship.

References

External links

1996 births
Living people
EHC Visp players
HC Davos players
Lausanne HC players
Swiss ice hockey defencemen